The Next One is a nickname found in ice hockey attached to a new, up and coming player, who is deemed to have the capacity for being a top, sport-dominating player, akin to Gordie Howe, Bobby Orr, Wayne Gretzky, Maurice Richard and Mario Lemieux.

List of "The Next One"s
The moniker has been applied to the following ice hockey players (in order of bestowment):

 Eric Lindros
 Paul Kariya
 Sidney Crosby
 John Tavares
 Connor McDavid
 Connor Bedard

History
The name is a play on Wayne Gretzky's nickname, "The Great One". Each of the players listed has been or is currently billed as the next Wayne Gretzky. Phil Kessel was considered to be on the list during his junior career, but his performance dropped in 2006 and he was taken off the list. To date, no player given the moniker has broken a National Hockey League record set by Gretzky, and only Crosby and Kessel (both as members of the Pittsburgh Penguins) have won the Stanley Cup. Mario Lemieux, "The Magnificent One", was the closest to breaking several of Gretzky's records, but he was never called "The Next One" by the media, because he was Gretzky's contemporary for most of his NHL career. The name continues to be used to highlight the achievements of young players still in their teenage years, who outcompete players older than them in minor league or international junior play as Gretzky did.

References 

National Hockey League history
Nicknamed groups of ice hockey players